Georges Parfait Mbida Messi (born 8 December 1980) is a Cameroonian former footballer who played as a midfielder.

Club career
Born in Yaoundé, Messi started playing professionally with hometown clubs Tonnerre Yaoundé and Canon Yaoundé, having a spell abroad in between with Çaykur Rizespor. He featured scarcely during the 2000–01 season, as the Turkish Süper Lig team finished in ninth position.

After leaving Canon, Messi played in Belgium with K.S.C. Lokeren Oost-Vlaanderen, but featured very rarely for the Pro League side. After a few months in Qatar he moved to Portugal, signing for S.C. Olhanense of the Segunda Liga and appearing in an average of 12 games in his first two seasons.

Messi had one of the best years as a professional in the 2008–09 campaign, scoring twice in 27 matches – mainly as a substitute – as the Algarve club returned to the Primeira Liga after 34 years. In January 2010 he left Olhanense and joined G.D. Interclube in Angola, with the Luanda team winning the Girabola championship shortly after.

Honours
Olhanense
Segunda Liga: 2008–09

Interclube
Girabola: 2010

References

External links

1980 births
Living people
Footballers from Yaoundé
Cameroonian footballers
Association football midfielders
Tonnerre Yaoundé players
Canon Yaoundé players
Süper Lig players
Çaykur Rizespor footballers
Belgian Pro League players
K.S.C. Lokeren Oost-Vlaanderen players
Al Kharaitiyat SC players
Primeira Liga players
Liga Portugal 2 players
S.C. Olhanense players
Girabola players
G.D. Interclube players
Liga 1 (Indonesia) players
Persib Bandung players
Cameroonian expatriate footballers
Expatriate footballers in Turkey
Expatriate footballers in Belgium
Expatriate footballers in Qatar
Expatriate footballers in Portugal
Expatriate footballers in Angola
Expatriate footballers in Indonesia
Cameroonian expatriate sportspeople in Turkey
Cameroonian expatriate sportspeople in Belgium
Cameroonian expatriate sportspeople in Qatar
Cameroonian expatriate sportspeople in Portugal
Cameroonian expatriate sportspeople in Angola
Cameroonian expatriate sportspeople in Indonesia